The Faculty of Dentistry, Chulalongkorn University, the first dental school in Thailand, was established in 1940. The school accepts about 140 undergraduate dental students per year. In the QS World University Rankings by Subject 2016. Faculty of Dentistry, Chulalongkorn is ranked  No. 1 among Thai Universities

Departments
 Department of Anatomy
 Department of Biochemistry
 Department of Community Dentistry
 Department of Microbiology
 Department of Occlusion
 Department of Oral and Maxillofacial Surgery
 Department of Oral Pathology
 Department of Operative Dentistry
 Department of Oral Medicine
 Department of Orthodontics
 Department of Periodontology
 Department of Prosthodontics
 Department of Pediatric Dentistry
 Department of Pharmacology
 Department of Physiology
 Department of Radiology

Hospital and Other Units
 Congenital Deformity Reconstruction
 Dental Services
 Esthetics
 Geriatric Dental
 Infectious Dental
 In Patient Ward
 Implantology
 Maxillofacial Reconstruction
 Post-Graduated
 Special Dental
 Dental IT Center
 Dental Material Sciences Research Center
 Oral biology Research Center

Major teaching affiliate
 Faculty of Dentistry, Chulalongkorn University Hospital, Bangkok

Address
 Henri Dunant Road, Pathumwan, Bangkok 10330, Thailand

See also
List of Dental Schools in Thailand

References

External links
Faculty of Dentistry, Chulalongkorn University Website
Chulalongkorn University 

Chulalongkorn University
Educational institutions established in 1940
University departments in Thailand
1940 establishments in Thailand